Eugène Fidler (Bălţi, Bessarabia, 1910 - Roussillon, Vaucluse, 1990) was a French painter and ceramicist of Bessarabian Jewish origin. Fidler belongs to the group of ceramicists who worked in the era called the « Golden Years of Vallauris », and he is also known as a painter, for his collages and water colours. His works have been purchased by collectors all over the world. He also showed them in France and abroad.

Biography
Fidler was born in Balti, then a Jewish and Russian settlement in Bessarabia in 1910. The family moved to Warsaw where his younger sister, Aline, who was to become a pianist was born in 1917. In 1918 his family came as refugees and settled in Nice, France. From 1918-1928 he attended primary and secondary schools in Switzerland and Germany, and then the Lycee Massena in Nice. From 1928-1930 Fidler served his military service in the French Army, thus becoming a French citizen. From 1930–1937 he studied art at the Ecole des Beaux Arts, and later at the Académie Julian. In 1937 he returned to Nice, following the death of his father, Aron Fidler. In 1940 Fidler married Edith Giler, a refugee who had fled Nazi Germany with her family, and settled in Mougins. At this time he began to learn the art of ceramics. The couple escaped from the French Riviera when the Nazis took over Free France in 1943, finding shelter in Roussillon under the assumed Gentile name of Fournier to evade the Vichy antisemitic laws and round-ups. He painted and made ceramics with his wife, producing small objects like buttons, earrings and necklaces. While holding showing, under the assumed name of Fournier, he met Samuel Beckett and painter Henri Hayden, also refugees on the run.

In 1944 when Provence was liberated. The Fidlers returned to Mougins, where he and Edith turned out utilitarian objects like vases, ashtrays, dishes and candle-holders. A daughter, Catherine, was born in 1947, but the couple divorced in 1950 and Fidler moved to Paris where he would works for the next couple of years. In 1952 Fidler resettled in Vallauris where he has regular shows of his work. At this period he became friends with Picasso and Jacqueline Roque. In 1956 he married his second wife, Edith Ramos, from the Azores, his student in ceramics and then co-worker. The couple had a daughter, Nathalie, in 1956. Fidler returned again to Roussillon in 1959, while travelling frequently across Europe and the Americas. He remained there painting and producing ceramics pieces in Roussillon-en-Provence until his death in 1990.

Works 
Fidler worked with many different painting techniques, including oil, water colours, inks, engraving, etching, pencils, and even the basic felt pens, but it is certainly that of the collage which he has explored the most. Setting himself apart from the trends and fashions of the times, he developed his own artistic style, finding his inspiration in his personal mythology, and background, as well as in the discoveries he made when travelling. For his work as a ceramicist he used mostly grog (also called firesand or chamotte). He never used the wheel, but built up his pieces by hand, in the traditional way.

He was a friend of the group of ceramicists called ‘Le Tryptique’, and was one of those who experimented various techniques for firing, and glazing. He also produced much larger pieces for the lobby of a private residence in Cannes, or for the schoolyard of a school in the Paris area.

Exhibitions 
 Vallauris at the Nerolium et at the  « Biennale de Ceramique d’Art »
 Barcelone – 'Sala Gaspar' (1958)
 Cannes, Galerie 65 and 'Galerie Art de France' (1961)
 Nice  - Galerie of the Hotel Plaza (1965)
 Los Angeles – Philadelphia Gallery
 San Remo - 'Galeria Beniamino' (1968)
 Avignon – 'Galerie Odile Guerin' (1973)
 Bonn (Germany) at the French Institute (1979)
 Cairo – at the Consul’s Residence (1981)
 Menerbes-en-Provence - 'Galerie Cance-Manguin' – (1982)
 Zurich (Switzerland)– Gallery Kringel (1985)
 Verbier (Switzerland) – 'Atelier Flaminia'  (1990)
 Oberhausen (Germany) part of the collection of the 'Stadische Galerie Schloss'.

References

Bibliography 
 Picasso’s Concrete Sculptures, par Sally Fairweather, Hudson Hills Press Inc. New-York, 1982.
 Damned to Fame. The Life of Samuel Beckett, par James Knowlson,  Bloomsbury Publishing, London – United Kingdom, 1996.
Eugene Fidler, Artiste Libre. Avant-propos de Simonne et Jean Lacouture. Essai critique de Francine Birbragher. Biro Editeur, Union Europeenne, 2010.
 EUGÈNE FIDLER - Terres mêlées, par Cathie Fidler, préface de Jean-Baptiste Pisano, éd. Ovadia, 2016

Films 
 Film by Binder : « Eugene and Edith Fidler : At work »  on show at the French Institute in Bonn – Germany, 1979.
 Film by James Knowlson, Interview for the Beckett Project : Eugene Fidler, Virginia – USA, 1989.
 FR3  (French local TV station) – Fidler, Show at the au Chateau-Museum of Cabries, France, 1999.

1910 births
1990 deaths
20th-century French painters
20th-century French male artists
French male painters
French ceramists
20th-century Russian Jews
Jewish painters
20th-century ceramists
Emigrants from the Russian Empire to France